Terje "Valfar" Bakken (3 September 1978 – 14 January 2004) was the lead singer and founder of the Norwegian black metal band Windir. Windir was started as a one-man project, but it was expanded into a full band with the release of their third album, 1184. Valfar originally sang his lyrics in Sognamål, a dialect of Norwegian, but eventually switched to English in an attempt to appeal to a broader audience.

Biography
Terje was born and grew up in Sogndal, of which he was very proud, and which later proved central to his lyrics. Terje decided to form Windir into a full band while he was at college, with some of his classmates becoming the other band members.
 
Valfar released two demos, Sogneriket and  Det Gamle Riket.

His second studio album, Arntor, was the last Windir album recorded by a line-up consisting solely of Valfar.

Despite his vocal style, Valfar did not relate his music to black metal, probably because of how the scene acted and was stereotyped. He instead dubbed Windir's musical style as "Sognametal". Other bands that have a Sognametal sound are Cor Scorpii, Vreid, Feigd, Mistur, and Sigtyr. He studied Sogndal history extensively and his poems stemmed from it.

Death
On 14 January 2004 Valfar went for a walk towards his family's cabin at Fagereggi, but he never arrived. Three days later, authorities found his body at Reppastølen in the Sogndal Valley. Valfar had been caught in a snow storm and died from hypothermia.

He was buried at Stedje Church in Sogndal on 27 January 2004. 

Nearly two months after his death, the remaining members of Windir decided to disband.

Discography
Sogneriket (demo, 1995)
Det Gamle Riket (demo, 1995)
Sóknardalr (full-length, 1997)
Arntor (full-length, 1999)
1184 (full-length, 2001)
Likferd (full-length, 2003)
Valfar, ein Windir (compilation, 2004)

References

External links
 Windir homepage

1978 births
2004 deaths
Deaths from hypothermia
Accidental deaths in Norway
Norwegian heavy metal singers
Norwegian black metal musicians
Musicians from Sogn og Fjordane
Norwegian multi-instrumentalists
Place of birth missing
20th-century Norwegian male singers
20th-century Norwegian singers
Musicians from Sogndal